Shahed - Bagher Shahr Metro Station is a station in Tehran Metro Line 1. It is between Haram-e Motahhar Metro Station and Palayeshgah Metro Station. It is located north of Behesht-e Zahra beside Northern Behesht-e Zahra Expressway.

The station was formerly called Shahed, but the name was changed, along with the name of Palayeshgah Metro Station, formerly known simply as Baghershahr on 26 August 2017.

References

Tehran Metro stations
Railway stations opened in 2007